Jared is a first name of biblical derivation.

Jared may also refer to:

Religion
 Jared (Biblical figure), a biblical fifth-generation descendant of Adam and Eve
 Jared (Book of Mormon king), a Jaredite king in the Book of Mormon
 Jared (founder of Jaredites), a primary ancestor of the Jaredites in the Book of Mormon

Others
 Jared, Washington, a community in the United States
 Jared, a brand operated by Sterling Jewelers

See also 
 
 
 Jarrett (disambiguation)